The East Bengal Club Season Awards are the official East Bengal awards presented on 1 August to various recipients in the Foundation Day celebrations of the club. The Inaugural award was handed out in 2011 which had three categories the highlight 'Bharat Gourav Award', the 'Lifetime Achievement Award' and the 'Player of the Season Award'.

Awards ceremony

East Bengal Club was founded on 1 August 1920 and every year on this day, the club celebrates its Foundation Day. Since 2011, the awards ceremony was launched by the club to commemorate and honour different sporting personalities as per the categories. The highest honour "Bharat Gaurav" award is handed out each year to honour outstanding sports personalities who have made the country proud in different fields of sports. Along with the "Bharat Gaurav" award, the club also presents two lifetime achievement awards namely "Dr Ramesh Chandra (Nosa) Sen Memorial Lifetime Achievement Award" and "Byomkesh Bose Memorial Lifetime Achievement Award" in respect of two former legends of the club, to honour former players and sportspersons who have represented the club. Along with these, the club also awards the "Player of the Season" to the best player of the previous season. The club also awards two awards dedicated to sports journalists namely the "Ajoy Bose Memorial Journalism Award" and "Pushpen Sarkar Memorial Photo-Journalism Award". The club also hands over the "Pankaj Gupta Memorial and Pratul Gupta Memorial Referee Award" to various referees from Kolkata maidan.

Winners

Bharat Gaurav Award

East Bengal Club had constituted the ‘Bharat Gaurav Award' in 2011, as the highest decoration by the club to honour the outstanding sports personalities who had made India proud in different fields of sports. Three times Olympic Champion and Indian Hockey legend Leslie Claudius was the first recipient of the award in 2011. The club has awarded the likes of Ahmed Khan, Arun Ghosh, Bachendri Pal, Milkha Singh, Dhanraj Pillay, Gurbux Singh, Kapil Dev since then. The award was not presented in two years 2020 and 2021 due to COVID-19 pandemic in India. In 2022 the awards were once again presented, with former India women's national cricket team captain Jhulan Goswami and tennis star Leander Paes jointly awarded the honour by the club.

Player of the Season Award

East Bengal had constituted the 'Player of the Season Award' in 2011 to honour the best football player of the previous season. It is decided by the Executive Members committee. Mehtab Hossain was the first recipient in 2011.

However, the first Player of the Season title was awarded at the end of the 2007–08 season, given by the then official marketing partner - Ideas Unlimited, with goalkeeper Subrata Paul being the winner.

Lifetime Achievement Award

East Bengal had constituted the 'Lifetime Achievement Award' in 2011 to honour a legendary sports personality of the club. It is decided by the Executive Members committee. India and East Bengal Legend Sudhir Karmakar and Sukumar Samajpati were the first recipients of this award in 2011.

Academy Player of the Year Award

East Bengal had constituted the 'Academy Player of the Year Award' in 2018 to honour the best football player of the East Bengal F.C. Academy for the previous season. It is decided by the Executive Members committee. Manoj Mohammed and PC Rohlupuia were the first recipients of this award in 2018.

Special Awards
On the occasion of the centenary celebrations of the club in 2019, a set of special awards were awarded to sports personalities associated with the East Bengal club.

Notes

References

East Bengal Club related lists